The Atlantic Coast Conference Men's Soccer Freshman of the Year is an annual award given to the best head coach in the Atlantic Coast Conference during the NCAA Division I men's soccer season. The award has been given since 1990.

Notable winners of the award include: Claudio Reyna (who captained the United States men's national soccer team from 1998 to 2007), Jay Heaps (known for his association with the New England Revolution as player and as coach), Paul Stalteri (Canadian regular, spending most of his career in Germany, most notably with Werder Bremen), Kyle Martino (better known as a color commentator for NBC Sports), and Patrick Mullins (two-time Hermann Trophy winner).

Winners

Freshman of the Year (1990–present)

References

College soccer trophies and awards in the United States
Freshman of the Year
Atlantic Coast
Awards established in 1990
College sports freshman awards
1990 establishments in the United States